The Cascajal River is a river of Panama.

See also
List of rivers of Panama

References
 Rand McNally, The New International Atlas, 1993.
CIA map, 1995.

Rivers of Panama